Vishi Jeet (born 18 August 1993) is a New Zealand cricketer. He plays first-class matches for Auckland.

See also
 List of Auckland representative cricketers

References

External links
 

1993 births
Living people
New Zealand cricketers
Auckland cricketers
People from Muzaffarnagar
Indian emigrants to New Zealand
New Zealand sportspeople of Indian descent